Overvallers in de Dierentuin  is a 1984 Dutch film directed by Christ Stuur.

Cast
Lex de Regt... 	Ros
Paul van Soest	... 	Plumming
Maurice Schmeink	... 	Haas
Miranda Sanders	... 	Sonja
Martin Versluys	... 	Steef
Cor van Rijn	... 	Directeur Vereboer
Marlous Fluitsma	... 	Vlier
Marina de Graaf... 	Secretaresse Wendy
Bartho Braat	... 	Tractorman Piet
Herman Haijemaije	... 	Bladenman Kees
Nico Schaap	... 	Agent Willem

External links 
 

Dutch adventure films
1984 films
1980s Dutch-language films